Rajesh Sanghi (6 December 1971 – 4 October 2014) was an Indian cricketer. He played four first-class matches for Rajasthan in 1993/94. He suffered a fatal heart attack while on holiday in the Maldives.

References

External links
 

1971 births
2014 deaths
Indian cricketers
Rajasthan cricketers
Cricketers from Mumbai